The Indian cricket team toured England from 21 July to 16 September 2011. The tour consisted of one Twenty20 International (T20I), five One Day Internationals (ODIs) and four Test matches, as well as a number of matches against English county sides. The opening Test at Lord's was the 2,000th Test. England's victory in the Third Test put them number one in the world rankings.

Squads

† Virat Kohli, Pragyan Ojha and RP Singh replaced the injured Yuvraj Singh, Harbhajan Singh and Zaheer Khan, respectively, for the third and fourth Test matches.
‡ Ravindra Jadeja replaced the injured Gautam Gambhir for the ODI series.

Tour matches

First-class: Somerset v Indians

India rested a number of their Test players for their first match of the tour; Mahendra Singh Dhoni, Ishant Sharma, Praveen Kumar and Harbhajan Singh were all left out of the team. The weakened bowling attack showed on the first day of the match, when Somerset scored 329 for the loss of two wickets from a rain-reduced 75 overs. Andrew Strauss, the England Test captain and Middlesex player, opened the innings as a guest batsman for Somerset, showed aggression initially, scoring 78 runs out of an opening partnership of 101, before getting out. Andrew McGlashan, summarising the day for ESPNcricinfo, described his innings as "commanding", and his shots "in good working order". After Strauss' dismissal, his opening partner Arul Suppiah began to score more freely, and reached his century off 179 balls, scoring his second 50 from just 57 deliveries. Suppiah and Nick Compton put on a second wicket partnership of 223 before Compton was dismissed for 88. Suppiah reached 156, his highest first-class score before he was out, and Somerset eventually declared their innings closed at 425/3.

In reply, the Indians struggled with the bat during the second, rain affected day; Somerset's Charl Willoughby took five wickets against a batting line-up which showed its lack of match practice. On the third morning, Suresh Raina controlled the strike well to bat his way to a century and stake his claim for a place in first Test, dominating a final wicket partnership of 84. Somerset once more look assured with the bat during their second innings, in which Strauss reached a century, eventually finishing 109 not out, and Peter Trego scored a rapid 85 runs from 57 balls. Somerset declared at tea on the final day, leaving India only a short period to bat in the second innings. The match finished as a draw, but Somerset coach Andrew Hurry suggested that Somerset had "bullied" India, and that it had been "a perfect three days" for Strauss.

Two-day: Northamptonshire v Indians

List A: Sussex Sharks v Indians

List A: Kent Spitfires v Indians

Twenty 20: Leicestershire Foxes v Indians

Test series

England won the Test series 4–0, their third whitewash in series of more than three Test matches. In winning the series by more than two clear matches, England took India's place at the top of the ICC Test Championship, while India dropped to third place. The men of the series were England's Stuart Broad – who took 25 wickets in the series – and Rahul Dravid – who scored three centuries.

1st Test

This match was the 2,000th Test in the history of cricket and the 100th between India and England. India's tour got off to the worst possible start with Zaheer Khan injuring himself on the first morning, leaving India with just three regular bowlers for the rest of the match. England made the most of the numerical advantage with Pietersen scoring a double-century as England declared with the score on 474/8. India responded well initially, but were soon bundled out for 286 with Rahul Dravid's century being the saving grace. England worked themselves into a position of control in the second innings, with India's bowling lacking any penetration. India were bowled out on the final day of the Test with nearly 30 overs to spare.

2nd Test

In their first innings, England were 124/8 at one point and looked sure to be dismissed for a very low first innings score. Stuart Broad and Graeme Swann then had a partnership of 73 runs and salvaged the innings for England who were eventually dismissed for 221. In reply, India reached a dominant score of 267/4 with Rahul Dravid and Yuvraj Singh sharing a partnership of 128 runs before England bowler Stuart Broad took a hat-trick, dismissing MS Dhoni (caught Anderson), Harbhajan Singh (lbw) and Praveen Kumar (bowled) and finished with his best Test figures to date, with 6 for 46. This hat-trick was part of a remarkable spell of 16 balls in which Broad got five wickets without conceding a run. India were eventually also dismissed for less than 300, with 288. Ian Bell was involved in a controversial run-out decision with the final delivery before tea on the third day when he was on 139 not out. Bell walked off the field, believing that the previous shot played by Eoin Morgan had gone to the boundary for four. However, the ball had been kept in play and was thrown back to the middle, where India removed the bails. It was referred to the third umpire, Billy Bowden, who gave Bell out. During the tea interval, England captain Andrew Strauss and coach Andy Flower met with the Indian captain Dhoni and their coach Duncan Fletcher and they agreed to withdraw the appeal. Bell was eventually dismissed for 159. England continued to bat strongly with tail-ender Tim Bresnan getting 90 runs. England were eventually bowled out for 544, setting India a target of 478 runs to win. India's response to this target was poor and they slumped to 68/6 at tea on day 4. England dismissed India's top second innings scorer, Sachin Tendulkar for 56 soon after tea. England wrapped the game up in the evening session, finally dismissing India for 158 runs, winning by 319 runs.

3rd Test

India were put into bat by England and were reduced to 111 for 7, before making a slight recovery to finish 224 all out on the first day. Alastair Cook made 294, the sixth highest score by an English batsman, as England finished on 710 for 7. Indian batsman Virender Sehwag was dismissed for golden duck in both innings of the match – a king pair. Sachin Tendulkar was run-out on 40, after backing up MS Dhoni, when Dhoni's strike was deflected back onto the stumps by Graeme Swann.

4th Test

Statistics

Individual

Team

Other
Kevin Pietersen reached 6,000 Test runs when he reached 172 in the first innings of the First Test.
Ian Bell reached 5,000 Test runs when he reached 208 in the first innings of the Fourth Test.

T20I series

Only T20I

ODI series

1st ODI

2nd ODI

3rd ODI

4th ODI

5th ODI

References

External links
Tour page at ESPNcricinfo

2011
Eng
2011 in English cricket
International cricket competitions in 2011